Vincent Delecroix (born 1969 in Paris) is a French philosopher and writer. A graduate from the École normale supérieure, and agrégé of philosophy, a specialist of Søren Kierkegaard on whom he did his doctoral thesis, he has taught philosophy of religion at the Ecole Pratique des Hautes Etudes as a lecturer. Also a novelist, he received the Prix Valery Larbaud in 2007 for Ce qui est perdu (published in 2006) and the Grand prix de littérature de l'Académie française after he published Tombeau d'Achille (in 2008). His literary and philosophical work is attentive to existential acts and experiences, such as love, singing and the sacred.

La chaussure sur le toit 
The story La chaussure sur le toit consists of ten short stories on the same theme: a shoe placed on the roof of the building opposite, in Paris. Each chapter is equivalent to a story with a well-defined character and a well-founded character: a dreamy child, a burglar in love, three crazy thugs, an undocumented immigrant, a television presenter, a melancholic dog, a homosexual firefighter, an eccentric lady, a contemporary artist, an angel in pants.

Bibliography

Works 
2003: Retour à Bruxelles, Actes Sud (series "Un endroit où aller")
2004: À la porte, Éditions Gallimard (series "Blanche")
2004: La Preuve de l'existence de Dieu, Actes Sud ("Un endroit où aller")
2005: Post-scriptum aux Miettes philosophiques. Kierkegaard, Ellipses (Philo-textes)
2006: Singulière philosophie. Essai sur Kierkegaard, Félin (series "les marches du temps")
2006: Ce qui est perdu, Gallimard ("Blanche"), Prix Valery Larbaud
2007: La chaussure sur le toit, Gallimard ("Blanche")
2008: Tombeau d'Achille, Gallimard ("L'un et l'autre"), Grand prix de littérature de l'Académie française
2012: Petit éloge de l'ironie, Gallimard
2012: Chanter. Reprendre la parole, Flammarion (series "Sens propre")
2015: Ce n'est point ici le pays de la vérité, Félin ("les marches du temps")

Participation to collective works 
2004: La Bible. Héros et légendes de l'Ancien Testament, Paris, Larousse (Junior)
2010: Lexique nomade, Paris, Christian Bourgois
2011: Cartographie de l'Utopie : l'œuvre indisciplinée de Michael Löwy
2012: Noël, quel bonheur ! Treize nouvelles affreusement croustillantes, Paris, Armand Colin
2012: Petite bibliothèque du chanteur, Paris, Flammarion, series "Champs Classiques, presented by V. Delecroix.
 Décapage (revue), chronique régulière.

Translations and prefaces 
2006: Søren Kierkegaard, Exercice en christianisme, Paris, Félin, series "Les marches du temps", transl. from Danish.
2009: Stendhal, La Chartreuse de Parme, Paris, Flammarion, series "GF", with an interview by V. Delecroix: Pourquoi aimez-vous La Chartreuse de Parme ?
2012: Sigmund Freud, Religion, Paris, Gallimard, series "Connaissance de l'inconscient", preface by V. Delecroix.

External links 
  Vincent Delecroix on Babelio (+ podcast)
 Vincent Delecroix on France Inter
 Vincent Delecroix - La chanson - Semaine de la pop philosophie 2014 Brussels on YouTube
 Vincent Delecroix on France Culture

École Normale Supérieure alumni
21st-century French philosophers
21st-century French writers
Prix Valery Larbaud winners
Writers from Paris
1969 births
Living people